Benjamin Trümner (born 17 May 1995) is a German footballer who plays as a midfielder for SG Barockstadt in the Hessenliga.

Honours

International
Germany
 UEFA European Under-19 Championship: 2014

References

External links
 

German footballers
Germany youth international footballers
Association football midfielders
KSV Hessen Kassel players
TSG 1899 Hoffenheim II players
1. FSV Mainz 05 II players
3. Liga players
People from Schwalmstadt
Sportspeople from Kassel (region)
1995 births
Living people
Footballers from Hesse